Etchmiadzin Cathedral is the mother church of the Armenian Apostolic Church, located in the city dually known as Etchmiadzin (Ejmiatsin) or Vagharshapat, Armenia. It is usually considered the first cathedral built in ancient Armenia, and is often considered the oldest cathedral in the world.

The original church was built in the early fourth century—between 301 and 303 according to tradition—by Armenia's patron saint Gregory the Illuminator, following the adoption of Christianity as a state religion by King Tiridates III. It was built over a pagan temple, symbolizing the conversion from paganism to Christianity. The core of the current building was built in 483/4 by Vahan Mamikonian after the cathedral was severely damaged in a Persian invasion. From its foundation until the second half of the fifth century, Etchmiadzin was the seat of the Catholicos, the supreme head of the Armenian Church.

Although never losing its significance, the cathedral subsequently suffered centuries of virtual neglect. In 1441 it was restored as catholicosate and remains as such to this day. Since then the Mother See of Holy Etchmiadzin has been the administrative headquarters of the Armenian Church. Etchmiadzin was plundered by Shah Abbas I of Persia in 1604, when relics and stones were taken out of the cathedral to New Julfa in an effort to undermine Armenians' attachment to their land. Since then the cathedral has undergone a number of renovations. Belfries were added in the latter half of the seventeenth century and in 1868 a sacristy (museum and room of relics) was constructed at the cathedral's east end. Today, it incorporates styles of different periods of Armenian architecture. Diminished during the early Soviet period, Etchmiadzin revived again in the second half of the twentieth century, and under independent Armenia.

As the center of Armenian Christianity, Etchmiadzin has been an important location in Armenia not only religiously, but also politically and culturally. A major pilgrimage site, it is one of the most visited places in the country. Along with several important early medieval churches located nearby, the cathedral was listed as a World Heritage Site by UNESCO in 2000.

History

Foundation and etymology 
In the early fourth century the Kingdom of Armenia, under Tiridates III, become the first country in the world to adopt Christianity as a state religion. Armenian church tradition places the cathedral's foundation between 301 and 303. It was built near the royal palace in what was then the Armenian royal capital of Vagharshapat, on the site of a pagan temple, which was dated by Alexander Sahinian to the Urartian period. Although no historical sources point to a pre-Christian place of worship in its place, a granite Urartian stele dated to the 8th-6th centuries BC was excavated under the main altar in the 1950s. It was likely dedicated to Ḫaldi or Teišeba. Also excavated under the altar was an amphora, which has been interpreted to have been a fire temple. The temple is believed to have been dedicated to either goddess Anahit, or archangel Sandaramet, major figures in Armenian mythology.

In his History of the Armenians, Agathangelos narrates the legend of the cathedral's foundation. Armenia's patron saint Gregory the Illuminator had a vision of Jesus Christ descending from heaven and striking the earth with a golden hammer to show where the cathedral should be built. Hence, the patriarch gave the church the name of Etchmiadzin (էջ ēĵ "descent" + մի mi "only" + -ա- -a- (linking element) + ծին tsin "begotten"), which translates to "the Descent of the Only-Begotten [Son of God]" or "Descended the Only Begotten". However, the name Etchmiadzin did not come into use until the 15th century, while earlier sources call it "Cathedral of Vagharshapat." The Feast of the Cathedral of Holy Etchmiadzin (Տոն Կաթողիկե Սբ. Էջմիածնի) is celebrated by the Armenian Church 64 days after Easter, during which a hymn, written by the 8th century Catholicos Sahak III, retelling St. Gregory's vision, is sung.

Malachia Ormanian suggested that the cathedral was built in 303 within seven months because the building was not huge and probably, partially made of wood. He also argued that the foundation of the preexisting temple could have been preserved. Vahagn Grigoryan dismisses these dates as implausible and states that at least several years were needed for its construction. He cites Agathangelos, who does not mention the cathedral in an episode that took place in 306 and suggests the usage of the span of 302 to 325—the reign of Gregory the Illuminator as Catholicos as the dates of the cathedral's construction.

Archaeological excavations in 1955–56 and 1959, led by Alexander Sahinian, uncovered the remains of the original fourth-century building, including two levels of pillar bases below the current ones and a narrower altar apse under the present one. Based on these findings, Sahinian asserted that the original church had been a three-naved vaulted basilica, similar to the basilicas of Tekor, Ashtarak and Aparan (Kasagh). However, other scholars, have rejected Sahinian's view. Among them, Suren Yeremian and Armen Khatchatrian held that the original church had been in the form of a rectangle with a dome supported by four pillars. Stepan Mnatsakanian suggested that the original building had been a "canopy erected on a cross [plan]," while architecture researcher Vahagn Grigoryan proposes what Mnatsakanian describes as an "extreme view," that the cathedral has been essentially in the same form as it is today.

Reconstruction and decline 

According to Faustus of Byzantium, the cathedral and the city of Vagharshapat were almost completely destroyed during the invasion of Sasanian King Shapur II in the 360s (circa 363). Due to Armenia's unfavorable economic conditions, the cathedral was renovated only partially by Catholicoi Nerses the Great (r. 353–373) and Sahak Parthev (r. 387–439).

In 387, Armenia was partitioned between the Roman Empire and the Sasanian Empire. The eastern part of Armenia where Etchmiadzin was located remained under the rule of Armenian vassal kings subject to Persia until 428, when the Armenian Kingdom was dissolved.

In 450, in an attempt to impose Zoroastrianism on Armenians, Sasanian King Yazdegerd II built a fire temple inside the cathedral. The pyre of the fire temple was unearthed under the altar of the east apse during the excavations in the 1950s.

By the last quarter of the fifth century the cathedral was dilapidated. According to Ghazar Parpetsi, it was rebuilt from the foundations by marzban (governor) of Persian Armenia Vahan Mamikonian in 483/4, when the country was relatively stable, following the struggle for religious freedom against Persia. Most researchers have concluded that, thus, the church was converted into cruciform church and mostly took its current form. The new church was very different from the original one and "consisted of quadric-apsidal hall built of dull, grey stone containing four free-standing cross-shaped pillars disdained to support a stone cupola." The new cathedral was "in the form of a square enclosing a Greek cross and contains two chapels, one on either side of the east apse."

Although the seat of the Catholicos was transferred to Dvin sometime in the 460s–470s or 484, the cathedral never lost its significance and remained "one of the greatest shrines of the Armenian Church." The last known renovations until the 15th century were made by Catholicos Komitas in 618 (according to Sebeos) and Catholicos Nerses III (r. 640–661). In 982 the cross of the cathedral was reportedly removed by an Arab emir.

During these centuries of neglect, the cathedral's "condition deteriorated so badly" that it prompted the prominent archbishop Stepanos Orbelian to write one of his most notable poems, "Lament on Behalf of the Cathedral" in 1300. In the poem, which tells about the consequences of the Mongol and Mamluk invasions of Armenia and Cilicia, Orbelian portrays Etchmiadzin Cathedral "as a woman in mourning, contemplating her former splendor and exhorting her children to return to their homeland [...] and restore its glory."

From revival to plunder 
Following the fall of the Armenian Kingdom of Cilicia in 1375, the See of Sis experienced decline and disarray. The Catholicosate of Aghtamar and the locally influential Syunik bishops enhanced the importance of the region around Etchmiadzin. In 1441 a general council of several hundred religious figures met in Etchmiadzin and voted to reestablish a catholicosate there. The cathedral was restored by Catholicos Kirakos (Cyriacus) between 1441 and 1443. At that time Etchmiadzin was under the control of the Turkic Kara Koyunlu, but in 1502, Safavid Iran gained control of parts of Armenia, including Etchmiadzin, and granted the Armenian Church some privileges.

During the 16th and 17th centuries, Armenia suffered from its location between Persia and Ottoman Turkey, and the conflicts between those two empires. Concurrently with the deportation of up to 350,000 Armenians into Persia by Shah Abbas I as part of the scorched earth policy during the war with the Ottoman Empire, Etchmiadzin was plundered in 1604.

The Shah wanted to "dispel Armenian hopes of returning to their homeland" by moving the religious center of the Armenians to Iran in order to provide Persia with a strong Armenian presence. He wanted to destroy the cathedral and have it physically transferred to the newly founded Armenian community of New Julfa near the royal capital of Isfahan. Shah Abbas offered the prospective new cathedral in New Julfa to the Pope. Etchmiadzin was not moved, possibly because of the high costs. In the event, only some important stones—the altar, the stone where Jesus Christ descended according to tradition, and Armenian Church's holiest relic, the Right Arm of Gregory the Illuminator—were moved to New Julfa. They were incorporated in the local Armenian St. Georg Church when it was built in 1611. Fifteen stones from Etchmiadzin still remain at St. Georg.

17th–18th centuries 
Since 1627, the cathedral underwent a major renovation under Catholicos Movses (Moses), when the dome, ceiling, roof, foundations and paving were repaired. At this time, cells for monks, a guesthouse and other structures were built around the cathedral. Additionally, a wall was built around the cathedral, making it a fort-like complex. 

The renovation works were interrupted by the Ottoman-Safavid War of 1635–36, during which the cathedral remained intact. The renovations resumed under Catholicos Pilippos (1632–55), who built new cells for monks and renovated the roof. During this century, belfries were added to many Armenian churches. In 1653–54, he started the construction of the belfry in the western wing of Etchmiadzin Cathedral. It was completed in 1658 by Catholicos Hakob IV Jugayetsi. Decades later, in 1682, Catholicos Yeghiazar constructed smaller bell towers with red tuff turrets on the southern, eastern, and northern wings.

The renovations of Etchmiadzin continued during the 18th century. In 1720, Catholicos Astvatsatur and then, in 1777–83 Simeon I of Yerevan took actions in preserving the cathedral. In 1770, Simeon I established a publishing house near Etchmiadzin, the first in Armenia. During Simeon's reign, the monastery was completely walled and separated from the city of Vagharshapat. Catholicos Ghukas (Lucas) continued the renovations in 1784–86.

Russian takeover 
The Russian Empire gradually penetrated Transcaucasia by the early 19th century. Persia's Erivan Khanate, in which Etchmiadzin was located, became an important target for the Russians. In June 1804, during the Russo-Persian War (1804–13), the Russian troops led by General Pavel Tsitsianov tried to take Etchmiadzin, but failed. A few days after the attempt, the Russians returned to Etchmiadzin, where they caught a different Persian force by surprise and routed them. Tsitsianov's forces entered Etchmiadzin, which, according to Auguste Bontems-Lefort, a contemporary French military envoy to Persia, they looted, seriously damaging the Armenian religious buildings. Shortly after, the Russians were forced to withdraw from the area as a result of the successful Persian defense of Erivan. According to Bontems-Lefort, the Russian behaviour at Etchmiadzin contrasted with that of the Persian king, who treated the local Christian population with respect.

On 13 April 1827, during the Russo-Persian War (1826–28), Etchmiadzin was captured by the Russian General Ivan Paskevich's troops without fight and was formally annexed by Russia, with the Persian-controlled parts of Armenia, roughly corresponding to the territory of the modern Republic of Armenia (also known as Eastern Armenia), according to the 1828 Treaty of Turkmenchay.

The cathedral prospered under Russian rule, despite the suspicions that the Imperial Russian government had about Etchmiadzin becoming a "possible center of the Armenian nationalist sentiment." Formally, Etchmiadzin became the religious center of the Armenians living within the Russian Empire by the 1836 statute or constitution (polozhenie).

In 1868, Catholicos Gevorg (George) IV made the last major alteration to the cathedral by adding a sacristy (museum and room of relics) to its east end. In 1874, he established the Gevorgian Seminary, a theological school-college located on the cathedral's premises. Catholicos Markar I undertook the restoration of the interior of the cathedral in 1888.

20th century and on 

In 1903, the Russian government issued an edict to confiscate the properties of the Armenian Church, including the treasures of Etchmiadzin. Russian policemen and soldiers entered and occupied the cathedral. Due to popular resistance and the personal defiance of Catholicos Mkrtich Khrimian, the edict was canceled in 1905.

During the Armenian genocide, the cathedral of Etchmiadzin and its surrounding became a major center for Turkish Armenian refugees. At the end of 1918, there were about 70,000 refugees in the Etchmiadzin district. A hospital and an orphanage within the cathedral's grounds were established and maintained by the U.S.-based Armenian Near East Relief by 1919.

In the spring of 1918 the cathedral was in danger of an attack by the Turks. Prior to the May 1918 Battle of Sardarabad, which took place just miles away from the cathedral, the civilian and military leadership of Armenia suggested Catholicos Gevorg (George) V to leave for Byurakan for security purposes, but he refused. The Armenian forces eventually repelled the Turkish offensive and set the foundations of the First Republic of Armenia.

Soviet period

Suppression 
After two years of independence, Armenia was Sovietized in December 1920. During the 1921 February Uprising Etchmiadzin was briefly (until April) taken over by the nationalist Armenian Revolutionary Federation, which had dominated the pre-Soviet Armenian government between 1918 and 1920.

In December 1923, the southern apse of the cathedral collapsed. It was restored under Toros Toramanian's supervision in what was the first case of restoration of an architectural monument in Soviet Armenia.

During the Great Purge and the radical state atheist policies in the late 1930s, the cathedral was a "besieged institution as the campaign was underway to eradicate religion." The repressions climaxed when Catholicos Khoren I was murdered in April 1938 by the NKVD. In August of that year, the Armenian Communist Party decided to close down the cathedral, but the central Soviet government seemingly did not approve of such a measure. Isolated from the outside world, the cathedral barely continued to function and its administrators were reduced to some twenty people. It was reportedly the only church in Soviet Armenia not to have been seized by the Communist government. The dissident anti-Soviet Armenian diocese in the US wrote that "the great cathedral became a hollow monument."

Revival 
Etchmiadzin slowly recovered its religious importance during World War II. The Holy See's official magazine resumed publication in 1944, while the seminary was reopened in September 1945. In 1945 Catholicos Gevorg VI was elected after the seven-year vacancy of the position. The number of baptisms conducted at Etchmiadzin rose greatly: from 200 in 1949 to around 1,700 in 1951. Nevertheless, the cathedral's role was downplayed by the Communist official circles. "For them the ecclesiastical Echmiadzin belongs irrevocably to the past, and even if the monastery and the cathedral are occasionally the scene of impressive ceremonies including the election of a new catholicos, this has little importance from the communist point of view," wrote Walter Kolarz in 1961.

Etchmiadzin revived under Catholicos Vazgen I since the Khrushchev Thaw in the mid-1950s, following Stalin's death. Archaeological excavations were held in 1955–56 and in 1959; the cathedral underwent a major renovation during this period. Wealthy diaspora benefactors, such as Calouste Gulbenkian and Alex Manoogian, financially assisted the renovation of the cathedral. Gulbenkian alone provided $400,000.

Independent Armenia 

In 2000 Etchmiadzin underwent a renovation prior to the celebrations of the 1700th anniversary of the Christianization of Armenia in 2001. In 2003 the 1700th anniversary of the consecration of the cathedral was celebrated by the Armenian Church. Catholicos Karekin II declared 2003 the Year of Holy Etchmiadzin. In September of that year an academic conference on the cathedral was held at the Pontifical Residence.

The latest renovation of the cathedral began in 2012, with a focus on strengthening and restoring the dome and the roof.

Architecture 

Etchmiadzin has a cruciform plan, four free-standing piers, and four projecting apses, which are semicircular on the interior and polygonal on the exterior. Its roof is mostly flat, except the conspicuous central cupola with the typically Armenian conical roof on a polygonal drum and the four belfries on the apses.

Although the cathedral was renovated many times through the centuries and some alterations were made in the 17th and 19th centuries, it largely retains the form of the building constructed in 483/4, especially the floor plan. The fifth-century building is the core of the cathedral, while the stone cupola, turrets, belfry, and rear extension are later additions. According to Varazdat Harutyunyan, its dome was originally wooden and was replaced with a stone one in a subsequent renovation. Portions of the northern and eastern walls of the original building have survived. 

Alexander Sahinian argued that Etchmiadzin holds a unique position in Armenian (and non-Armenian) architecture history because it reproduces features of different periods of Armenian architecture. It makes the building of "immense architectural interest." Hewsen suggested that the design of the core of the church is a mixture of a Zoroastrian fire temple and a mausoleum of classical antiquity. In the West, its style has been described as Byzantine, "Armeno-Byzantine", or as "combining Byzantine influence with Romanesque style." Foreign visitors have called it ascetic, unostentatious, extremely austere and commanding. 

Two Soviet travel writers described it as a "massive cube surmounted by a faceted cone on a simple cylinder." James Bryce called it "small [...] compared with its fame or importance", while another British visitor called it "diminutive by European standards." Luigi Villari opined that building is "unusual and interesting rather than beautiful, and altogether inferior to many other Armenian churches." Robert H. Hewsen agreed; he noted that it is "neither the largest nor the most beautiful of Armenian churches", nevertheless, "the overall impression presented by the ensemble is inspiring, and Armenians hold the building in great reverence." 

The cathedral, especially the core, is built in grey stone, while the 17th century additions in bright red. The rear extension, added by Catholicos Gevorg IV in 1868, was heavily criticized by 19th century visitors. Telfer described it as being "in exquisitely bad taste, for it is totally at variance architecturally with the church itself." H. F. B. Lynch was harsher; he called it a "stupid building" that "from outside lengthens and perverts the original edifice."

The bell of Etchmiadzin's 17th century bell tower contained a Tibetan Buddhist inscription. It was removed in the late 1930s by the Soviets and has disappeared without trace. Hewsen suggested that it was "probably the long-forgotten gift of some Mongol or Ilkhanid khan."

Reliefs 

Engraved on the exterior of the edifice are decorative geometric and floral patterns as well as blind arcades and medallions depicting saints. The northern wall of the cathedral contains two reliefs which depict Paul the Apostle and Saint Thecla and an equal-armed cross (Greek cross) with Greek inscriptions. Paul is seated on cross-legged stool. These reliefs have been tentatively dated between the first and sixth centuries. Shahkhatunian and Ghevont Alishan suggested that these reliefs were created before the invention of the Armenian alphabet c. 405. Art historian Sirarpie Der Nersessian believed that they are from the fifth or sixth century. Vahagn Grigoryan insisted that the reliefs were created in the "very beginning, in 302–325." According to Hasratyan, they are the earliest reliefs on the cathedral's walls and among the earliest items of Christian Armenian sculpture art.

reliefs and ornaments on the western (main) belfry

Interior 
Etchmiadzin's interior is extensively decorated with frescoes widely described as Persian or Persian-influenced. They depict flowers, birds, scrollwork, arabesque ornamentations. The early frescoes inside the cathedral were restored in the 18th century. Stepanos Lehatsi (Stephen of Poland) illustrated the belfry in 1664. In the 18th and 19th centuries, Armenian painters created frescoes of scenes from the old testament and Armenian saints. Naghash Hovnatan painted parts of the interior between 1712 and 1721. His paintings on the dome and the painting of the Mother of God under the altar have survived to this day. Other members of the prominent Hovnatanian family (Hakob, Harutyun and Hovnatan) created paintings throughout the 18th century. Their work was continued by the succeeding generations of the same family (Mkrtum and Hakob) in the 19th century. Telfer described its interior as "gloomy, ineffective, and entirely deficient in any fascinating touches of architectural force and decoration."

The wooden doors of the cathedral were carved in Tiflis in 1889. The paintings were moved out of the cathedral by the order of Catholicos Mkrtich Khrimian in 1891 and are now kept in various museums in Armenia, including the National Gallery of Armenia. The frescoes inside the cathedral were restored by Lydia Durnovo in 1956, and in 1981–82 by Vardges Baghdasaryan. In the 1950s, the stone floor was replaced with one of marble.

Influence

On Armenian architecture 
The design of the cathedral—classified as "a four-apsed square with ciborium," and called "Etchmiadzin-type" in Armenian architectural historiography—was not common in Armenia in the early medieval period. The now-destroyed St. Theodore Church of Bagaran, dating from 624 to 631, was the only known church with a significantly similar plan and structure from that period.

In the 19th century, during an architectural revival that looked back to Armenia's past, Etchmiadzin's plan was directly copied in new Armenian churches. Some notable examples from this period include the narthex of the St. Thaddeus Monastery in northern Iran, dating from 1811 or 1819 through 1830, and the Ghazanchetsots Cathedral in Shushi, dating from 1868. 

Its plan was also replicated in the Armenian diaspora, such as in the plans and designs of the Armenian Church, Singapore (1835) and the Armenian Church of Bucharest, Romania (1911–12).

On European architecture 
Art historian Josef Strzygowski, who was the first European to thoroughly study Armenian architecture and place Armenia in the center of European architecture, suggested that several churches and chapels in Western Europe have been influenced by the cathedrals of Etchmiadzin and Bagaran due to similarities found within their plans. According to Strzygowski, some examples of churches influenced by Etchmiadzin and Bagaran are the 9th-century church of Germigny-des-Prés in France (built by Odo of Metz, probably an Armenian) and San Satiro of Milan, Italy. This view was later supported by Alexander Sahinian and Varazdat Harutyunyan. Sahinian suggested that Armenian church architecture was spread in Western Europe in the 8th–9th centuries by the Paulicians, who migrated from Armenia en mase after being suppressed by the Byzantines during the Iconoclasm period. Sahinian added many other medieval churches in Europe, such as the Palatine Chapel of Aachen in Germany, to the list of churches to have been influenced by the cathedrals of Etchmiadzin and Bagaran and by Byzantine decorative arts. According to Murad Hasratyan, Etchmiadzin's design was spread to Europe via the Eastern Roman Empire and served as a model—besides Germigny-des-Prés and San Satiro—for the Nea Ekklesia church in Constantinople and the churches of Mount Athos in Greece.

Heritage designation 
In 2000 UNESCO added Etchmiadzin Cathedral, the churches of St. Hripsime, St. Gayane, Shoghakat and the ruined Zvartnots Cathedral to the list of World Heritage Sites. In 1983 the Soviet Armenian government listed the cathedral and its complex as historical heritage, which was reaffirmed by the Government of Armenia in 2002.

Relics 
The museum of the cathedral has numerous items on display, including manuscripts and religious objects. Among its notable exhibits are the Holy Lance (Spear), relics belonging to Apostles of Jesus and John the Baptist, and a fragment of Noah's Ark.

Significance 

The locus of Etchmiadzin is "a sanctified soil" similar to Temple Mount and the Golden Temple, for Jews and Sikhs, respectively. In his first encyclical (1893) as Catholicos, Mkrtich Khrimian called the cathedral the "Zion of Ararat." In 1991 Catholicos Vazgen I described the cathedral as "our Solomon's Temple." The cathedral complex has been called "Armenian Vatican" or "Armenian Mecca" as it is a major pilgrimage site for Armenians worldwide. Since the cathedral has been so important to the development of Armenians' sense of identity, a pilgrimage to Etchmiadzin is "as much as ethnic as a religious experience." Anglican archdeacon and historian Theodore Edward Dowling wrote in 1910 that Etchmiadzin and Mount Ararat are the "two great objects of Armenian veneration."

For many centuries, Etchmiadzin was the national and political center of the stateless Armenian people, with one journalist describing it as "the focal point of Armenians everywhere." Before the foundation of the First Republic of Armenia and the official designation of Yerevan as its capital in 1918, Western sources emphasized Etchmiadzin's political significance. A 1920 book prepared by the Historical Section of the British Foreign Office acknowledged that Etchmiadzin "was regarded as the national capital of the Armenians." "Deprived of a political head and even a political capital the [Armenian] people have, for at least five hundred years, looked to Etchmiadzin as the home of their people, the centre to which they looked for guidance, unfailing sympathy, and practical aid," wrote W. Llewelyn Williams in 1916.

Oldest cathedral
Etchmiadzin is considered by a number of scholars as Armenia's first cathedral. It has sometimes been described as Armenia's first church building, but this claim has found little support among scholars. Robert W. Thomson, Stepan Mnatsakanian, Vrej Nersessian, and Grigoryan have all rejected it and posit that Armenia's first church was in Ashtishat, in the Taron region of Western Armenia. Thomson argues that Etchmiadzin was neither the first church, nor the first cathedral in Armenia.

A 2020 book on the cathedral, authorized by the Armenian Church, insisted that Etchmiadzin is the first church of Christian Armenia, although earlier Christian places of worship such as chapels or shrines existed prior.

A number of scholars also hold that Etchmiadzin is the oldest cathedral in the world. According to Encyclopedia of the Peoples of Africa and the Middle East, it is "generally regarded" as the oldest cathedral in the world, while historian Steven Gertz wrote in Christianity Today that Etchmiadzin is regarded as such "according to some scholars."

Notable visitors 
Early European visitors to Etchmiadzin who gave descriptions of the cathedral included Jean-Baptiste Tavernier (before 1668), Jean Chardin (1673), Joseph Pitton de Tournefort (c. 1700), James Morier (1810–16), Robert Ker Porter (1817–20), Friedrich Parrot (1829), August von Haxthausen (1843), Moritz Wagner (1843), James Bryce (1876), H. F. B. Lynch (1893).

Many prominent individuals have visited Etchmiadzin, including Russian diplomat and playwright Alexander Griboedov (1828), Russian mystic Helena Blavatsky (1849), Russian poets Valery Bryusov and Andrei Bely (1929), Fridtjof Nansen (1925), Armenian American writer William Saroyan (1976), English composer Benjamin Britten, Russian singer-songwriter Vladimir Vysotsky, Russian-American poet and essayist Joseph Brodsky, Andrei Sakharov, Cher, Alain Delon, Kim Kardashian and many others.

Religious leaders like Patriarch Cyril of Bulgaria (1967), Archbishops of Canterbury Donald Coggan (1977) and George Carey (1993), Patriarch Ilia II of Georgia (1997, 2003), Pope John Paul II (2001), Bartholomew I of Constantinople (2001), Ignatius Zakka I Iwas (2002), Patriarch Kirill of Moscow (2010), Pope Francis (2016) have visited Etchmiadzin. Francis gave a prayer at the cathedral on 24 June 2016, where he called the cathedral "a witness to the history of your people and the centre from which its spirituality radiates."

Leaders of several countries, such as Russia (Vladimir Putin in 2005), France (Jacques Chirac in 2006 and Nicolas Sarkozy in 2011), Georgia (Mikheil Saakashvili in 2004, Giorgi Margvelashvili in 2014), Romania (Emil Constantinescu in 1998), Lebanon (Michel Aoun, 2018), Germany (Angela Merkel, 2018), and royalty, such as Nicholas I of Russia (1837), King Mahendra of Nepal (1958), Prince Charles (2013) have visited the cathedral as part of their state or private visits to Armenia.

Cultural depictions 

The coat of arms of Russian-administered Erivan (Yerevan), approved in 1843, featured the cathedral.

The Etchmiadzin monthly, the official periodical of the Mother See of Holy Etchmiadzin founded in 1944, features the cathedral on its cover page as the logo.

In the 1991 film Mayrig, directed by French-Armenian director Henri Verneuil, footage of the cathedral is shown when Azad Zakarian, the main character and a son of Armenian genocide survivors, is being questioned about his faith in a Catholic school.

The Soviet Union and Armenia issued postage stamps depicting the cathedral in 1978 and 2009, respectively. The cathedral is depicted on the obverse side of the 50,000 dram banknote (2001) of Armenia.

Artistic depictions

References 
Notes

Citations

Bibliography

Academic articles

Published books 
Specific

 

General

 
 
 

 Reprint of the 1934 ed. published by the Cambridge University Press

Armenian Apostolic cathedrals in Armenia
Tourist attractions in Armavir Province
World Heritage Sites in Armenia
Church buildings with domes
4th-century churches
5th-century churches
4th-century establishments in Armenia
Armenian Apostolic churches in Vagharshapat